The Von der Heydt Museum is a museum in Wuppertal, Germany.

The Von der Heydt Museum includes works by artists from the 17th century to the present time.

History
The museum is housed in the former city hall of Elberfeld, which in 1902 became a municipal museum.

The museum was named in 1961 after the Von der Heydt family. Banker August von der Heydt and his son Eduard von der Heydt (1882–1964) were important patrons.

Notable works
 Still Life with Beer Mug and Fruit

Gallery

Directors 
 1902–1929: Friedrich Fries (1865–1954)
 1929–1952: Victor Dirksen (1887–1955)
 1953–1962: Harald Seiler (1910–1976)
 1962–1985: Günter Aust (1921–2018)
 1985–2006: Sabine Fehlemann (1941–2008)
 2006– 1 May 2019: Gerhard Finckh (born 1952)

Notes and references

External links
 —

Art museums and galleries in Germany
Buildings and structures in Wuppertal
Culture in Wuppertal
Museums in North Rhine-Westphalia